Stanley Augustine Dimgba Sopuruchi (born 26 March 1993) is a Nigerian professional footballer who plays as a forward for South African Premier Division side Stellenbosch.

References

1993 births
Living people
Nigerian footballers
People from Ilorin
Sportspeople from Kwara State
Association football forwards
Plateau United F.C. players
Kwara United F.C. players
Warri Wolves F.C. players
Sunshine Stars F.C. players
Enyimba F.C. players
Stellenbosch F.C. players
Nigeria Professional Football League players
South African Premier Division players
Nigeria international footballers
Nigeria youth international footballers
Nigerian expatriate footballers
Nigerian expatriate sportspeople in South Africa
Expatriate soccer players in South Africa